Stansberry Research is a privately owned American publishing company founded by Frank Porter Stansberry. The company is headquartered in Baltimore, Maryland, with additional offices in Florida, Oregon, and California. The company specializes in investment research with an information services product line consisting primarily of monthly and bi-monthly advisory newsletters written by a variety of financial editors. Topics include natural resource, power, oil and mining company investments, as well as health care and biotechnology. Value, corporate bond and alternative investing are also featured. The company claims its newsletter has subscribers in over one hundred countries.

History
Stansberry Research (previously Stansberry & Associates Investment Research) was founded in 1999 as an independent investment research firm. In addition to his editorial duties, company founder, Frank Porter Stansberry, writes opinion pieces in a variety of financial publications discussing diverse and controversial issues ranging from the auto bailout to the European financial panic, among others. Other Stansberry public information efforts include production of a 2011 infomercial entitled "The End of America," as well as the founding of "The Project to Restore America," a 2012 endeavor aimed at restructuring American governance. He has also been recorded using racist and homophobic slurs on his premium radio program. 

In 2014, Snopes.com investigated the firm's claim that United States currency will "collapse", and found this claim to be false. Snopes.com alleged him to be anti-nationalist and working against USA government due to his analysis of dollar's future collapse. Stansberry advertising and social media messages often contain highly inflammatory and alarmist messages warning of impending financial disaster, with an extreme anti-government stance. Stansberry has also been described as "simply an umbrella website that draws internet traffic to a single site and then sells subscriptions for a variety of people who use them for publishing purposes."

Analysts
Porter Stansberry is the founder of Stansberry Research and the editor of Stansberry’s Investment Advisory. Steve Sjuggerud is the founder and editor of the Stansberry Research publication True Wealth, launched in 2001.  He is also a co-author of a book on investment strategies called Safe Strategies for Financial Freedom. David Eifrig is the editor of Retirement Millionaire and is a regular contributor to the Stansberry Research publication Daily Wealth.  Eifrig is the author of two books, The Doctor’s Protocol Field Manual, and High Income Retirement: How to Safely Earn 12% to 20% Income Streams to Your Savings.  Matt Badiali is the editor of S&A Resource Report, which focuses on natural resources, metals, energy, and investments. He joined Stansberry Research in 2005 and has a BS in Earth Sciences from Penn State University and a Masters in Geology from Florida Atlantic University. Dan Ferris has been the editor of Extreme Value, a newsletter that concentrates on safe stocks, good businesses, and steep discounts, since 2002. Stansberry Research published Ferris’ book World Dominating Dividend Growers: Income Streams that Never Go Down in July 2014.

Fraud accusation and conviction
In November 2003, the Securities and Exchange Commission accused Stansberry of fraud committed while he edited various newsletters published under the umbrella of Agora, Inc. and Agora subsidiary, Pirate Investors LLC. In August 2007, the court found Stansberry guilty with the U.S. Fourth Circuit Court of Appeals and subsequently denied a 2009 appeal.

References

Privately held companies based in Maryland
Publishing companies established in 1999
1999 establishments in Maryland
American companies established in 1999
Companies based in Baltimore